Don Hickey (12 July 1902 – 25 January 1976) was an  Australian rules footballer who played with Geelong in the Victorian Football League (VFL).

Notes

External links 

1902 births
1976 deaths
Australian rules footballers from Victoria (Australia)
Geelong Football Club players